Joan Cornelis Reynst (23 January 1798 – 11 October 1871), member of the Reynst family, was acting Governor-General of the Dutch East Indies in 1844–1845.

References 

1798 births
1871 deaths
Dutch nobility
Governors-General of the Dutch East Indies
People from Rheden